The 2023 Bahrain Grand Prix (officially known as the Formula 1 Gulf Air Bahrain Grand Prix 2023) was a Formula One motor race that was held on 5 March 2023 at the Bahrain International Circuit in Sakhir, Bahrain.

Background
The event was held across the weekend of the 3–5 March. It was the opening round of the 2023 Formula One World Championship.

Entrants

The drivers and teams were the same as the season entry list with no additional stand-in drivers for the race.

Oscar Piastri, Nyck de Vries and Logan Sargeant made their Formula One Grand Prix season debuts with McLaren, AlphaTauri and Williams, respectively, although De Vries made his Formula One Grand Prix debut at the 2022 Italian Grand Prix for Williams.

Tyre choices

Tyre supplier Pirelli brought the C1, C2, and C3 tyre compounds (designated hard, medium, and soft, respectively) for teams to use at the event.

Track changes 
The third DRS activation point was moved farther ahead, being positioned  after turn 15.

Qualifying 
Qualifying was held on 4 March 2023 at 18:00 local time (UTC+3).

Qualifying classification 

Notes
  – Lando Norris and Logan Sargeant set identical lap times in Q1. Norris advanced to Q2 as he set his time earlier.

Race 
The race was held on 5 March 2023, starting at 18:00 local time (UTC+3).

Race report 
Max Verstappen led comfortably from the start, only losing the lead briefly during the first round of pit stops. Sergio Pérez was slow away at the start and lost second place to a fast starting Charles Leclerc. Fernando Alonso and Lewis Hamilton battled on the run down to turn 4, Alonso was hit by his teammate Lance Stroll, causing both Aston Martins to lose positions. Alonso came out on top in a wheel-to-wheel battle with George Russell on lap 13, both drivers lost out in the pit stops to Valtteri Bottas in the Alfa Romeo.

Oscar Piastri retired after 13 laps in his Formula One debut with an electrical failure. Meanwhile his teammate Lando Norris also had engine issues, this time with the hydraulics, requiring six pit stops to manage the problem. Esteban Ocon picked up a five-second time penalty for lining up in his grid spot incorrectly. He did not serve the full five seconds in the pit, and was given a subsequent ten second time penalty, and then a further five second time penalty for speeding in the pit lane while serving the second penalty.

Pérez made it past Leclerc on lap 26, with Red Bull Racing the only front running team to use the soft tyre for both the first two tyre stints. After the second round of pit stops, Stroll, who was racing with a broken wrist and toe, overtook Russell as the latter came out of the pit on cold tyres, with Stroll having pitted a lap earlier. Alonso and Hamilton engaged in a battle for fifth place. Alonso overtook Hamilton into turn 4 on lap 37 before a snap of oversteer on the corner exit for Alonso allowed Hamilton back past. One lap later Alonso pulled off an overtake at turn 10.

Leclerc's race came to an end on lap 40, with his car suffering a mechanical failure while running in third, bringing out the virtual safety car. Alonso overtook Carlos Sainz Jr. using DRS on the run down to turn 11 on lap 45. Meanwhile, Pierre Gasly overtook Alexander Albon for ninth place, having started from last. Zhou Guanyu pitted on the penultimate lap for soft tyres, and set the fastest lap of the race on the final lap.

Verstappen took his first win at the Bahrain International Circuit by almost twelve seconds from his teammate Pérez. Alonso finished third, his first podium since the 2021 Qatar Grand Prix and Aston Martin's first since the 2021 Azerbaijan Grand Prix.

Race classification 

Notes
  – Nico Hülkenberg received a 15-second time penalty for exceeding track limits. His final position was not affected by the penalty.

Championship standings after the race

Drivers' Championship standings

Constructors' Championship standings

 Note: Only the top five positions are included for both sets of standings.

See also 
 2023 Sakhir Formula 2 round
 2023 Sakhir Formula 3 round

References

External links

Bahrain
Grand Prix
Bahrain Grand Prix
Bahrain Grand Prix
Grand Prix